Warawut Motim (born 8 May 1998) is a Thai professional footballer who plays as a right-back for Thai League 3 club North Bangkok University.

External links
 

1998 births
Living people
Warawut Motim
Association football defenders
Warawut Motim
Warawut Motim
Warawut Motim
Warawut Motim